Mileh (also Romanized as Mīleh) is a village in Dasht-e Sar Rural District, Dabudasht District, Amol County, Mazandaran Province, Iran. At the 2006 census its population was 589, in 231 families. During the Abbasid period, Mileh served as a garrison town. It was the first stage on the road heading east from Amol to Sari, with the town of Barji being the next one.

References 

Populated places in Amol County